Sonja Alice Selma Toni Ziemann (8 February 1926 – 17 February 2020) was a German film and television actress. In the 1950s, she was among Germany's most prominent actresses, awarded the 1950 Bambi for appearing, together with Rudolf Prack, in Schwarzwaldmädel. From the 1960s, she turned to more serious acting in international films such as The Secret Ways. She played in several anti-war films such as Strafbataillon 999. She also appeared on stage and in television.

Career 
Ziemann took dance education with Tatjana Gsovsky. Beginning in 1941, she performed in operettas and revues. After World War II, her performances primarily came at the Metropol Theater in Berlin. Ziemann began working in films when she was 15, and by age 18 "was a star of the first magnitude". She was a notable German film star in the 1950s, particularly in the Heimatfilm genre. She formed a screen couple with actor Rudolf Prack in a number of films, including Schwarzwaldmädel (The Black Forest Girl) in 1950. The light-hearted film was welcome in a country conscious of common guilt. It earned her the Bambi for the most popular actress that year. Ziemann and Prack played together again in Die Heide ist Grün (The Heath Is Green) in 1951, attracting over 16 million people to the cinema. She also played with partners such as Karlheinz Böhm, O. W. Fischer, Gert Fröbe, Johannes Heesters, Curd Jürgens and Hardy Krüger.

In retrospect, she described the roles of sweet country girl as kitsch. Her first character role came in 1958 in the Polish social drama The Eighth Day of the Week. Her popularity in Germany dropped considerably after the film. She was the first German actor to star in an international production, the 1961 spy drama The Secret Ways (Geheime Wege, 1961), her first American film. She appeared in The Bridge at Remagen in 1969.

In 1962, Ziemann returned to the stage, portraying Eliza Doolittle in productions of My Fair Lady in Zurich and Munich. She also appeared as Wedekind's Lulu. With Götz George, she played in works by Tennessee Williams and toured the world.

Personal life 
With her first husband, the industrialist Rudolf Hambach, Ziemann had a son named Pierre who died in 1970 at age 16 from cancer. In 1961, Ziemann married Polish novelist Marek Hłasko. In 1969, they divorced. From 1972 until his death in 2001, she was married to her acting colleague Charles Régnier. Ziemann died on 17 February 2020 at the age of 94.

Filmography 
Films with Ziemann include:

 A Gust of Wind (1942) – Gina Galassi
 Die Jungfern vom Bischofsberg (1943)
 Beloved Darling (1943) – Lette Eilers
 Hundstage (1944) – Marion Seidel
  (1944) – Helga Gutentag
 Freunde (1945) – Vilma
 Tell the Truth (1946) – Lisa (friend)
 Allez Hopp (1946) – Patsy
 King of Hearts (1947) – Dagmar Mauritius
 Ghost in the Castle (1947) – Bianca
 Liebe nach Noten (1947) – Mimi, Barner's niece
 Thank You, I'm Fine (1948) – Irmgard Holk
 Paths in Twilight (1948) – Lissy Stenzel
 Nothing But Coincidence (1949) – Gerti Danzer
 My Wife's Friends (1949) – Fee Freiberg – Kabarettist
 Nights on the Nile (1949) – Susanne
  (1949) – Anni Klingebeil
 After the Rain Comes Sunshine (1949) – Sabine
 The Black Forest Girl (1950) – Bärbele Riederle
  (1950) – Brigitte Brummer
 One Night Apart (1950) – Käthe
 The Merry Wives of Windsor (1950) – Frau Fluth
 You Have to be Beautiful (1951) – Maria Schippe
  (1951) – Euritrite
  (1951) – Wally, cigarette seller
 The Heath Is Green (1951) – Helga
 The Thief of Bagdad (1952) – Fatme, die Diebin von Bagdad
 I Can't Marry Them All (1952) – Dschidschi
 Made in Heaven (1952) – Marta
 At the Well in Front of the Gate (1952) – Inge Bachner
 Dutch Girl (1953) – Antje
 Christina (1953)
 Life Begins at Seventeen (1953) – Madelien de Jeu
 The Private Secretary (1953) – Gerda Weber
 It Was Always So Nice With You (1954) – Ballet dancer
 My Sister and I (1954) – Christine
 The Seven Dresses of Katrin (1954) – Katrin Burian
 The Big Star Parade (1954) – Sonja Ziemann
 The Little Czar (1954) – Sonja / Sonja Ilyanova
 Love Without Illusions (1955) – Ursula
 I Was an Ugly Girl (1955) – Anneliese Howald
 A Girl Without Boundaries (1955) – Helga Gruber
 The Bath in the Barn (1956) – Antje, the mayor's wife
  (1956) – Daniela 'Dany' Ruland
 Opera Ball (1956) – Helene Hollinger, Hollinger's wife
 Emperor's Ball (1956) – Franzi
  (1956)
 Supreme Confession (1956) – Giovanna
 The Zurich Engagement (1957) – Sonja Ziemann
 Spring in Berlin (1957) – Nicoline
 Doctor Bertram (1957) – Nelly
 The Italians They Are Crazy (1958)
 Tabarin (1958) – Rosine Forestier
 The Eighth Day of the Week (1958) – Agnieszka Walicka
 Serenade of Texas (1958) – Sylvia
 Stalingrad: Dogs, Do You Want to Live Forever? (1959) – Katja
  (1959) – Eva
 Menschen im Hotel (1959) – Flämmchen
 Rebel Flight to Cuba (1959) – Carka
  (1960) – Julia Deutschmann
 Darkness Fell on Gotenhafen (1960) – Maria Reiser
 The Nabob Affair (1960) – La milliardaire
 The Secret Ways (1961) – Julia
  (1961) – Hanna Schäferkamp
 A Matter of WHO (1961) – Michele
 The Dream of Lieschen Mueller (1961) – Lieschen Müller
 Her Most Beautiful Day (1962) – Helen
  (1962) – Maria
 Axel Munthe, The Doctor of San Michele (1962) – Prinzessin Clementine
  (1964) – Lawyer Jane Painter-Talbot
  (1965) – Margot
 The Bridge at Remagen (1969) – Greta Holzgang
 De Sade (1969) – La Beauvoisin
  (1971, TV Mini-Series) – Mrs. Corby
  (2011, TV documentary) (final film role)

References

External links 

 
 
 Dorlis Blume, Irmgard Zündorf: Sonja Ziemann  Deutsches Historisches Museum foundation

1926 births
2020 deaths
20th-century German actresses
21st-century German actresses
German film actresses
German television actresses
People from Dahme-Spreewald
People from the Province of Brandenburg